Veliyan Parushev (20 March 1968 – 29 January 2013) was a Bulgarian footballer who played as a defender.

Career

After starting his career with Sliven, Parushev signed with CSKA Sofia in the early 1990s, where he is best remembered for scoring a last-minute goal against Parma in a UEFA Cup match that enabled the "redmen" to eliminate their opponent on the away goals rule. Parushev subsequently made a name for himself with Neftochimic during a successful period for the team, establishing himself as a highly influential player and also serving as the team captain in the late 1990s.

Following his retirement from the game in the early 2000s, Parushev worked as a truck driver for a German firm. He died of cancer on 29 January 2013.

References

1968 births
2013 deaths
Bulgarian footballers
Bulgaria international footballers
OFC Sliven 2000 players
PFC CSKA Sofia players
Neftochimic Burgas players
First Professional Football League (Bulgaria) players
Association football midfielders
Association football defenders
Sportspeople from Sliven